Massilia consociata is a Gram-negative,  non-spore-forming, rod-shaped bacterium from the genus Massilia and family Oxalobacteraceae, which was isolated from a human clinical specimen. Its 16S rRNA gene sequence has shown that M. consociata belongs to the class Betaproteobacteria and is closely related to Naxibacter varians.

References

External links
Type strain of Massilia consociata at BacDive -  the Bacterial Diversity Metadatabase

Burkholderiales
Bacteria described in 2011